Seven Old Men and a Girl is a 1968 Soviet comedy film directed by Yevgeny Karelov.

Plot
Elena Velichko — a young graduate of the sports institute, is sent to work as a coach in a sports club. She is full of bright hopes. However, instead of promising athletes, she is given a "group of health" - six not very young men, who are neither healthy nor complaisant.

Elena tries in every possible way to get rid of her charges. She gives them some ridiculously light, sometimes overwhelming burdens, screams and is verbally rude, she tries to get herself fired, but this proves to be difficult: according to Soviet legislation, a young specialist can only be dismissed for a very serious offense.

Soon, a seventh student, Volodya Tyupin, joins the group of six "old men". He likes Elena and he wants her affection. Volodya in every possible way tries to help the girl realize her plan: to the best of his abilities, he breaks up the group from within and discredits the coach. But in fact, everything turns out the other way round: the "old people" become sincerely sympathetic for their instructor and try their best to be successful.

In the finals, all seven fall into an extreme situation (a collector is robbed before their eyes) and it turns out that the Lena's classes were not in vain - the "old people" have become not only physically strengthened, but have also united in a friendly team.

Cast
Svetlana Savyolova as Elena Velichko, the new coach
Valentin Smirnitsky as Vladimir Tyupin,   correspondence student
Boris Chirkov as Vladimir Nikolaevich Yakovlev,  a big boss
Nikolay Parfyonov as Sukhov,   chief of less
Boris Novikov as Stepan Petrovich Bubnov,   plumber
Aleksei Smirnov as Maslennikov,   opera singer
Anatoly Adoskin as Anatoly Sidorov,   hopeless bachelor
Alexander Beniaminov as Sergey Sergeevich Anisov,   the collector
Yevgeny Vesnik as director of sports club
Georgy Vitsin as robber №1  
Yuri Nikulin as robber №2 
Yevgeny Morgunov as robber №3  
Anatoli Papanov as Legal Adviser
Nina Agapova as Kravtsova, the doctor
Georgi Tusuzov as Murashko, Professor
Tatyana Bestayeva as Jeanette, Frenchwoman, bride of Anatoly Sidorov
Pyotr Savin as head of Anisov
Anatoly Obukhov as Grisha, the Thug
Emma Treyvas as barmaid

References

External links

Mosfilm films
Soviet comedy films
1968 comedy films